The name Polyaenus or Polyenus may refer to:

Polyaenus, 2nd century Macedonian author
Polyaenus of Lampsacus (c. 340 – 278 BC), Greek mathematician
Polyaenus (wasp), a genus of wasp